= Margarete Furcht =

Austrian-British chemist (1879–1976)

- Born: 10 November 1879; Vienna, Austria-Hungary
- Died: 12 February 1976 (aged 96); London, England

Margarete Furcht (also Margaret and Margarethe) (10 November 1879 – 12 February 1976) was an Austrian-born British chemist, the daughter of a Jewish stockbroker. She was the first female chemist to obtain a doctoral degree certificate in Austria-Hungary.

Furcht fled Austria after the Anschluss, settling in London, and was declared exempt from internment on 30 November 1939. She was living that year in Islington.

Furcht died on 12 February 1976 in London, aged 96.
